"Only To Be" is a single by New Zealand rock band Six60. It was released as on 28 November 2011 as the third single from their self-titled debut studio album. It reached number 5 on the New Zealand Singles Chart

Track listing
 Digital single
 "Only to Be" - 4:41

Chart performance
"Only to Be" debuted on the RIANZ charts at number 36 and has peaked to number 5.

Charts

Release history

References

2011 singles
Six60 songs
2011 songs